Haplochromis argens is a species of haplochromine cichlid endemic to Lake Victoria where it is only known from the Tanzanian portion.  This species reaches a length of  SL. It feeds on zooplankton.

References

argens
Fish of Lake Victoria
Fish described in 2013
Taxonomy articles created by Polbot